Carmichael is an unincorporated community in Clarke County, Mississippi, United States.

History
Carmichael was once home to a school and general store.

A post office operated under the name Carmichael from 1887 to 1956.

References

Unincorporated communities in Mississippi
Unincorporated communities in Clarke County, Mississippi